The Immaculate Conception Cathedral Also Zamora de Hidalgo Cathedral It is a Catholic religious building built in the first half of the 19th century, by the famous Celayan architect Eduardo Tresguerras. It is located in the Michoacan city of Zamora de Hidalgo in Mexico.

It was built between 1832 - 1838.

In neoclassical style, it bears some resemblance to the Temple of Carmen in the city of Celaya (also made by Tresguerras).

It has a Latin cross plant, and a single nave and cruise ship, where the dome rises. The cover is of neoclassical style, with two bodies and auction.

See also
Roman Catholicism in Mexico
Immaculate Conception Cathedral

References

Roman Catholic cathedrals in Mexico
Roman Catholic churches completed in 1838
1838 establishments in Mexico
Buildings and structures in Michoacán
19th-century Roman Catholic church buildings in Mexico